Michael Booth (born 20 January 1946) is a British gymnast. He competed in seven events at the 1968 Summer Olympics.

References

1946 births
Living people
British male artistic gymnasts
Olympic gymnasts of Great Britain
Gymnasts at the 1968 Summer Olympics
Sportspeople from Huddersfield